Theretra sumatrensis is a moth of the  family Sphingidae. It is known from south-east Asia.

References

Theretra
Moths described in 1917